Vexillum badense is an extinct species of sea snail, a marine gastropod mollusk, in the family Costellariidae, the ribbed miters.

Description
The length of the shell varies between 19 mm and 27 mm.

References

External links
 Hoernes R. & Auinger M. (1880). Die Gastropoden der Meeres-Ablagerungen der ersten und zweiten miocänen Mediterran-Stufe der österreichisch-üngarischen Monarchie. Abhandlungen der Kaiserlich-Königlichen Geologischen Reichsanstalt. 12(2): 53-113, pls 7-12
 Harzhauser, M. & Landau, B. (2021). An overlooked diversity—the Costellariidae (Gastropoda: Neogastropoda) of the Miocene Paratethys Sea. Zootaxa. 4982(1): 1-70

badense
Gastropods described in 1880